Akimi Barada (茨田 陽生, born 30 May 1991) is a Japanese football player. He currently plays for Shonan Bellmare.

Career statistics

Club
Updated to end of 2018 season 

1Includes FIFA Club World Cup and Japanese Super Cup.

International

Honours

Club
Kashiwa Reysol
J. League Division 1 : 2011
J. League Division 2 : 2010
Emperor's Cup : 2012
Japanese Super Cup : 2012
J. League Cup : 2013
Suruga Bank Championship : 2014

References

External links

Profile at Omiya Ardija

1991 births
Living people
Association football people from Chiba Prefecture
Japanese footballers
J1 League players
J2 League players
Kashiwa Reysol players
Omiya Ardija players
Shonan Bellmare players
Association football midfielders